The T. S. Haun House, on Main St. in Jetmore, Kansas, was built in 1879.  It was listed on the National Register of Historic Places in 1973.

It is now part of the Haun Museum.

References

External links
Haun museum in Hodgeman County, KS
Haun Museum

Museums in Hodgeman County, Kansas
History museums in Kansas
National Register of Historic Places in Hodgeman County, Kansas
Houses completed in 1879